The Chile national rugby league team represents Chile in rugby league. The team is operated by Futbol a 13 Chile and sanctioned by the Rugby League International Federation to represent Chile at international level in the sport of rugby league.

History
Rugby league (known locally as Futbol a 13) was introduced to Chile in 2015 when the Futbol a 13 Chile organization was formed. Working in partnership with Latin Heat Rugby League, an Australian-based expat team representing Chile competed in the Cabramatta International Nines, marking the first time a Chilean team participated in an organized rugby league competition.

The first domestic match in Chile was played in October 2016 in Negrete, which was followed by the announcement of the inaugural Chilean domestic competition. The competition was expanded with the Super Liga 13 Chile launching in 2017.

In November 2016, Chile competed in the inaugural international rugby league competition in South America, hosted in Miramar, Argentina, comprising Chile, Argentina and a number of select sides from around the region which were supported by the Latin Heat organization. The competition culminated in Argentina and Chile taking part in their first official international match, which Argentina won 16-0.

In November 2017, Los Ángeles, Chile, hosted the inaugural Latin American Rugby League Championship, comprising the national teams of Chile, Argentina, Colombia and Brazil. Chile won the inaugural tournament, defeating Argentina 32-12 in the final.

In November 2018 Chile participated in the 2018 Americas Rugby League Championship, which acted as the American qualifying competition for the 2021 Rugby League World Cup; as such they became the first South American nation to enter the competition. They were eliminated after losing 62-0 to the USA on November 13, 2018.

All-time results record

Players

Current squad
Squad selected for 2021 Rugby League World Cup qualifiers;
Jonathan Espinoza
Iziah Catrileo
Bradley Millar
Trent Millar
Thomas Garrido
James Horvat
Eugene Araya
Chris Brantes
Patrick Camaano
Mana Castillo-Sioni
Nick Doberer
Jaden Laing
Alvaro Avaria Jimenez
Jose Nitor-Alvear
Brandon Tobar
Francisco Leiva
Piero Diaz
Taylor Salas
Ferec Cavezas
Junior Sandoval
Zecil Yao
Eddie Wegener
Benjamin Fisher

References

South American national rugby league teams
Chile national rugby league team
National rugby league teams